The 1992 Saab International, also known as the Athens Open', was a men's tennis tournament played on outdoor clay courts in Athens, Greece that was part of the World Series of the 1992 ATP Tour. It was the seventh edition of the tournament and was played from 5 October until 12 October 1992. Third-seeded Jordi Arrese won the singles title.

Finals

Singles

 Jordi Arrese defeated  Sergi Bruguera 7–5, 3–0 (Bruguera retired)
 It was Arrese's only singles title of the year and the 5th of his career.

Doubles

 Tomás Carbonell /  Francisco Roig defeated  Marcelo Filippini /  Mark Koevermans 6–3, 6–4
 It was Carbonell's 3rd title of the year and the 9th of his career. It was Roig's 1st title of the year and the 2nd of his career.

References

External links
 ITF tournament edition details

Saab International
ATP Athens Open
Saab International
October 1992 sports events in Europe